Jesús Mirabal Leal (born 1948 in Pinar del Río Province) is a former Cuban decathlete.

He won the Central American and Caribbean Games in 1970 and 1974 and took bronze medals at the Pan American Games in 1971 and 1975. He was the first Cuban decathlete to break the 7000 point barrier, and eventually established his national record at 7582 points.

External links
GBR Athletics

1948 births
Cuban decathletes
Athletes (track and field) at the 1971 Pan American Games
Athletes (track and field) at the 1975 Pan American Games
Living people
Pan American Games medalists in athletics (track and field)
Pan American Games bronze medalists for Cuba
Central American and Caribbean Games gold medalists for Cuba
Competitors at the 1970 Central American and Caribbean Games
Competitors at the 1974 Central American and Caribbean Games
Central American and Caribbean Games medalists in athletics
Medalists at the 1971 Pan American Games
Medalists at the 1975 Pan American Games
People from Pinar del Río Province